Georg Euler (23 December 1905 – 1993) was a German international footballer.

References

1905 births
1993 deaths
Association football forwards
German footballers
Germany international footballers